"None of Ur Friends Business" is a song by American R&B singer Ginuwine. It was co-written and produced by Timbaland and recorded for his second studio album 100% Ginuwine (1999). The song was released as the album's fourth and final single in October 1999 and peaked at number 48 on the US Billboard Hot 100.

Credits and personnel
Credits lifted from the liner notes of 100% Ginuwine.

Craig Brockman – strings
Jimmy Douglass – mixing engineer
Ginuwine – producer, writer
Timbaland – mixing engineer, producer, writer

Charts

Weekly charts

Year-end charts

References

1999 singles
Ginuwine songs
Song recordings produced by Timbaland
Songs written by Timbaland
Songs written by Ginuwine
1998 songs
550 Music singles